Zbigniew Zaleski (29 April 1947 in Rogoziniec – 31 August 2019) was a Polish politician and was a Member of the European Parliament (mep) for the Lublin Voivodship with the Civic Platform, part of the European People's Party and sat on the European Parliament's Committee on International Trade.

Zaleski was a substitute for the Committee on Development and a member of the Delegation for relations with Israel.

Education
 1994: Masters (1972), Doctorate (1978) and titular professor of Psychology

Career
 since 1974: School psychologist (1973–1974) and lecturer at the John Paul II Catholic University of Lublin
 2002-2004: Regional Councillor of the Voivodship of Lublin
 since 1992: Member of the American Psychological Association
 since 2003: Founder and Chairman of the European Cooperation Association

See also
 2004 European Parliament election in Poland

External links

References

1947 births
2019 deaths
Civic Platform MEPs
MEPs for Poland 2004–2009